John Howorth, D.D. (d. 1668) was a 17th-century priest and academic.

Howorth was born in Manchester and educated at Magdalene College, Cambridge. He was ordained in 1625; and became a prebendary of Peterborough in 1639. He was Fellow of Magdalene from 1645; Master of Magdalene from 1664 until his death in 1668; and Vice-Chancellor of the University of Cambridge from 1766 until 1767.

References 

17th-century English Anglican priests
Vice-Chancellors of the University of Cambridge
Alumni of Magdalene College, Cambridge
Fellows of Magdalene College, Cambridge
Masters of Magdalene College, Cambridge
1688 deaths
Clergy from Manchester